The Gunman from Bodie is a 1941 American Western film directed by Spencer Gordon Bennet and written by Adele Buffington. This is the second film in Monogram Pictures' Rough Riders series, and stars Buck Jones as Marshal Buck Roberts, Tim McCoy as Marshal Tim McCall and Raymond Hatton as Marshal Sandy Hopkins, with Christine McIntyre, Dave O'Brien and Robert Frazer. The film was released on September 26, 1941.

Plot

Cast          
Buck Jones as Marshal Buck Roberts aka Bob 'Bodie' Bronson
Tim McCoy as Marshal Tim McCall
Raymond Hatton as Sandy Hopkins
Christine McIntyre as Alice Borden 
Dave O'Brien as Joe Martin 
Robert Frazer as Wyatt
Charles King as Steve Dunn 
Lynton Brent as Red 
Max Waizmann as Sheriff Cox
Gene Alsace as Henchman
John Merton as Bill Cook 
Frank LaRue as Jud Mason
Silver as Silver

See also
The Rough Riders series:
 Arizona Bound
 The Gunman from Bodie
 Forbidden Trails
 Below the Border
 Ghost Town Law
 Down Texas Way
 Riders of the West
 West of the Law

References

External links
 

1941 films
1940s English-language films
American black-and-white films
American Western (genre) films
1941 Western (genre) films
Monogram Pictures films
Films directed by Spencer Gordon Bennet
1940s American films